Redesdale in Henrico County, Virginia near Richmond, Virginia was built in 1925.  It was listed on the National Register of Historic Places in 2008.  The listing included a  area with 4 contributing buildings, 3 contributing sites and 3 contributing structures.

It was designed by William Lawrence Bottomley, a society architect.

References

External links
Redesdale, 25 photos at Historic American Buildings Survey

Houses on the National Register of Historic Places in Virginia
Gothic Revival architecture in Virginia
Colonial Revival architecture in Virginia
Houses completed in 1925
Houses in Henrico County, Virginia
National Register of Historic Places in Henrico County, Virginia